Petrophile imbricata is a species of flowering plant in the family Proteaceae and is endemic to southwestern Western Australia. It is a shrub with overlapping, needle-like leaves and oval heads of hairy cream-coloured flowers.

Description

Taxonomy
Petrophile imbricata was first formally described in 1995 by Donald Bruce Foreman in Flora of Australia from material he collected in Boyagin Nature Reserve in 1985. The specific epithet (imbricata) refers to the overlapping leaves and involucral bracts.

Distribution and habitat
This petrophile grows in dense scrub, woodland and forest mostly near the Dryandra Woodland, Boddington, Boyagin Nature Reserve and Katanning in the Avon Wheatbelt and Jarrah Forest biogeographic regions of southwestern Western Australia.

Conservation status
Petrophile imbricata is classified as "not threatened" by the Western Australian Government Department of Parks and Wildlife.

References

imbricata
Eudicots of Western Australia
Endemic flora of Western Australia
Plants described in 1995